Jianshan Subdistrict is a subdistrict located on the center of Hexi District, Tianjin, China. It borders Yuexiu Road and Guajiasi Subdistricts in its north, Chentangzhuang and Donghai Subdistricts in its east, Taihu Road and Meijiang Subdistricts in its south, and Youyi Road Subdistrict in its west. In the year 2010, 91,767 inhabitants were counted for this subdistrict.

The name Jianshan came from two villages that used to exist within the region during the Ming and Qing dynasties, both of which were situated on top of a hill compared to the low-lying landscape of their surrounding.

Geography 
Jianshan Subdistrict is bisected by Fuxing River that runs eastward to flow into the Hai River. Jiefang South Road and Dongnan Banhuan Expressway pass through here.

History

Administrative divisions 
As of 2021, Jianshan Subdistrict administered the following 13 residential communities:

References 

Township-level divisions of Tianjin
Hexi District, Tianjin